Avant Garson is the debut solo album by American jazz pianist Mike Garson, released on the Contemporary label.

Reception
The Allmusic review states "Pianist Mike Garson's debut as a leader shows off his virtuosity and versatility on a set of unaccompanied solos. The music is consistently colorful and full of surprises, ranging from the melodic to bordering on the avant-garde".

Track listing
All compositions by Mike Garson; except as indicated.
 "Portrait of Chick" - 7:10	
 "Someday My Prince Will Come" (Larry Morey, Frank Churchill) - 3:46
 "Jennifer" - 1:59	
 "Avant Garson Part I" - 1:20 	
 "Classical Improvisation with a Jazz Flavoring and a Touch of Jewish in D Minor" - 4:17 	
 "Jewish Blues" - 3:22	
 "Over the Rainbow" (Harold Arlen, Yip Harburg) - 3:31 	
 "How Deep is the Suppression" - 3:52	
 "Avant Garson II" - 2:17	
 "One Light Aesthetic Wave" - 0:38	
 "Chopin Visits Brooklyn" - 1:54	
 "Avant Gershwin" (George Gershwin, Garson) - 5:26

Personnel
Mike Garson – piano

References

Contemporary Records albums
Mike Garson albums
1980 debut albums